Kamran Mammadov (born 12 March 1990) is an Azerbaijani Greco-Roman wrestler.

Mammadov won a bronze medal at the 2013 European Wrestling Championships in Tbilisi., in 2014 European Wrestling Championships and 2016 European Wrestling Championships.

References

External links
 

1990 births
Living people
Azerbaijani male sport wrestlers
Universiade medalists in wrestling
Universiade silver medalists for Azerbaijan
European Wrestling Championships medalists
Medalists at the 2013 Summer Universiade
Islamic Solidarity Games medalists in wrestling
Islamic Solidarity Games competitors for Azerbaijan
21st-century Azerbaijani people